Haji Khatib Kai (born 10 October 1971) is a Tanzanian ACT Wazalendo politician and Member of Parliament for Micheweni constituency since 2010 to 2020.

References

Living people
1971 births
Civic United Front MPs
Tanzanian MPs 2010–2015
Zanzibari politicians
Alliance for Change and Transparency politicians